Taisei (written: 大成, 泰成, 太勢, 大晟 or 大聖) is a masculine Japanese given name. Notable people with the name include:
, Japanese chief of the Ryukyu Islands
, Japanese former football player
, Japanese football player
, Japanese musician
, Japanese football player
, Japanese professional baseball player
, Japanese football player
 Taisei Okazaki (born 1982), Japanese musician, DJ and music producer
, Japanese freestyle skier

Japanese masculine given names